Arthur James Bradley Reed (19 July 1883 – 1 April 1951) was an Australian rules footballer who played for the Geelong Football Club in the Victorian Football League (VFL).

Notes

External links 

1883 births
1951 deaths
Australian rules footballers from Victoria (Australia)
Geelong Football Club players
People educated at Geelong Grammar School